Farag Ali (5 February 1963 – 27 October 2015) was an Egyptian wrestler. He competed in the men's freestyle 52 kg at the 1984 Summer Olympics.

References

External links
 

1963 births
2015 deaths
Egyptian male sport wrestlers
Olympic wrestlers of Egypt
Wrestlers at the 1984 Summer Olympics
Place of birth missing